Goun-dong (고운동) is neighborhood of Sejong City, South Korea.

References

External links
 Official website

Neighbourhoods in Sejong City